King Paul may refer to:

King Paul of Greece (r. 1947–1964)
King Paul of Alodia (12th century)